Ni'ma Abd Nayef al-Jabouri, known by his nom de guerre Abu Fatima al-Jaheishi or Abu Fatima al-Jiburi, was initially in charge of the ISIS operations in southern Iraq before he moved to the northern city of Kirkuk. He then became Governor of the South and Central Euphrates region in the Islamic State and a senior member in the IS hierarchy.

The available information indicates that as of 2016, Abu Fatima is alive and part of the inner circle of Islamic State leader Abu Bakr al-Baghdadi, is serving as his deputy in the position of the overall leader for Iraq. He succeeded Abu Muslim al-Turkmani, who was killed by a US drone strike near Mosul on 18 August 2015.

References

External links
Abu Fatima al-Jaheishi on Counter Extremism Project

Islamic State of Iraq and the Levant members from Iraq
Living people
People from Kirkuk
Year of birth missing (living people)